is a Japanese professional sumo wrestler from Mito, Ibaraki. His debut in maezumō was in January 2014. His highest rank has been maegashira 14.

Early life
Fujiwara was an accomplished sumo wrestler from a young age. He would first start sumo in his second year of elementary school after joining a sumo club run by the father of ōzeki Musōyama. In the fourth year he would even be involved in the retirement ceremony for the ōzeki. In his sixth year of elementary he would progress to the point of getting third in the All-Japan Elementary School Sumo Tournament. After middle school Fujiwara would attend the prestigious high school sumo program of Saitama Sakae. In his second year there he would win the National high school selection sumo tournament, and in his third year while captaining the team would finish top 5 in the same competition.

Career
After high school in January 2014, he would join Fujishima stable to be under the guidance of his mentor Musoyama. He would make his debut under the name Kotaro (虎太郎) alongside the likes of Ichinojō, Tsurugishō, and Takakentō. He would make a quick work of the three lowest division and would debut in makushita by the end of the year. In July 2015 he would suffer a 0-7 make-koshi record that would see him demoted back to sandanme but, after finishing with a 5–2 record would immediately be promoted back up. In January 2016 he participated in an eight-man playoff for the makushita yūshō after producing a strong 6–1 record, but he lost in the first round to Tochimaru. In May 2018, he changed his shikona from his family name to Bushōzan (武将山). After the shikona change he began producing more consistent results and spent more time in the top quarter of makushita. After 4-3 kachi-koshi in January 2021 at makushita 2 would see him promoted to the sekitori ranks of jūryō. His promotion made him the first sekitori produced by his stablemaster Musōyama and the first for his stable in five years. He would record a 7-8 make-koshi record in his debut in jūryō but would retain his same rank for the following basho. He would follow this up with a 10-5 kachi-koshi record and from there steadily rise up the ranks. In January 2022 at a career high rank of jūryō 1 he would start the basho with ten straight losses before finally getting a win on day 11, he would then lose three more bouts before winning on the final day to finish 2–13, his worst record since March 2018.

In March 2023 he was promoted to the top makuuchi division for the first time. He is the first wrestler from Fujishima stable to reach the top division since  in November 2011.

Fighting style
Bushōzan is an oshi-sumo wrestler who prefers pushing and thrusting techniques to fighting on the mawashi. His most common kimarite used was a straightforward oshi-dashi, or push out.

Career record

See also
List of active sumo wrestlers

References

External links

1995 births
Living people
Japanese sumo wrestlers
People from Mito, Ibaraki
Sumo people from Ibaraki Prefecture